Gray death or Gray Death may refer to:

Medicine 
Gray death, a street drug in the United States

Music 

 "Gray Death", a single by Xiu Xiu from Dear God, I Hate Myself

Ecology 
Gray death, name of episodes of great smog pollution

Fiction 
Gray Death, a mysterious nano-virus in Deus Ex video games